The Slovak diaspora refers to both historical and present emigration from Slovakia, as well as from the former Czechoslovakia.  The country with the largest number of Slovaks living abroad is the United States.

Slovak diaspora in Romania 

Approximately 17,000-21,000 ethnic Slovaks live in Romania. The largest Slovak communities live in the following counties:

 Bihor RO, Bihar SK (7,370) 
 Arad RO & SK (5,695) 
 Timiș RO, Temeš SK(1,908) 
 Sălaj RO, Salaš SK (1,366) 
 Caraș-Severin RO, Krašovsko-severinská župa SK (340) 
 Satu Mare RO, Satmárska župa SK (186) 
 Hunedoara RO, Huňadská župa SK (100)

The Slovak diaspora in Romania could be divided into two major groups:

Group 1: The Slovaks of Arad county 
This group could be found in the flat Romanian county of Banat, especially around the town of Nădlac, RO (Nadlak, SK). In the sense of economy and culture, this is quite a developed society, in Nădlac, RO (Nadlak, SK), there is a Slovak school operating and Slovak books get printed there. The Slovaks in the county of Arad are descendants of the secondary colonizing generations - meaning, the Slovak communities re-settled there from Békéscsaba, HU (Békečská Čaba, SK), in Hungary in the 19th century. Today, Slovaks create in the town of Nădlac alone almost half of its population.

According to the 2011 census, the ethnic structure of Nădlac is:

 Romanians 47.26%
 Slovaks 43.85%
 Roma 5.1%
 Hungarians 2.37%
 Others 1.75%

Group 2: The Slovaks of Munții Plopiș highlands (Bihar & Sălaj counties) 
Munții Plopiș, RO (Plopišské Vrchy, SK) are a part of the Romanian mountains located to the east of the city of Oradea, on a border of two counties - Bihor, RO (Bihar, SK) and Sălaj, RO (Salaš, SK). The Slovaks living there are the descendants of the colonials arriving in three waves between 1790 and 1838. A big part of the Plopiš highlands Slovaks took part in the Czecho-Slovak emigration after the World War 2. They settled in Czechia, along the border of Slovakia, where they create a specific society today.

Bihor county is mostly mountainous. Localities where the Slovak communities live can be found on these mountains, such as Șinteu, RO (Nová Huta, SK); Făgetu, RO (Gemelčička, SK); Șerani, RO (Šarany, SK); Sacalasău Nou, RO (Nový Šastelek, SK); Marca Huta, RO (Bojovksé, SK); Budoi, RO (Bodonoš, SK); Valea Cerului, RO (Čerpotok, SK); Borumlaca -Vărzari, RO (Boromlak - Varzaľ, SK); Fegernic RO & SK; Lugașu de Jos, RO (Lugaše, SK); Zăuan-Băi, RO (Zavaň, SK).

A village with the highest number of Slovaks is a part of this group - Șinteu, RO (Nová Huta, SK), located in the Bihor county, according to census in 2002, from the total number of inhabitants 1.287, the Slovaks were numbered at 1.264. There is a Slovak school or a kindergarten in almost every village. The Slovak highschool Theoretical Lyceum of Jozef Kozáček is also located in Budoi. Teachers are sent to two schools by the Ministry of Education, Science, Research and Sports of the Slovak Republic (in Șinteu and Făgetu), who work in the area as support for Slovak compatriots. In almost every village there are Slovak priests who are natives of this area.

Religious structure of the Slovak diaspora in Romania 
The religious structure of Slovaks in Romania could be also divided into two sections. The majority of Bihor county Slovaks are Roman Catholics, meanwhile the majority of Arad county Slovaks are Lutherans. Due to intermarriages, we can also see some Orthodox and Byzantine Catholics among them.

According to the census from 2020, this is religious structure of the Slovak diaspora in Romania overall:

 Roman Catholics 67.22%
 Lutherans 17.65%
 Orthodox 3.94%
 Pentecostal 3.62%
 Byzantine Catholics 3.52%
 Other or unaffiliated 4.92%

Political representation of the ethnic Slovaks in Romania 
Since the Slovaks are officially recognised as an ethnic minority in Romania, they share together with Czechs a common representative Adrian Merka since 2008 for Democratic Union of Czechs and Slovaks in Romania.

Education 
In 1995, the second Slovak lyceum in Romania was established in the Slovak locality of Budoi, RO (Bodonoš, SK) in the Bihor-Sălaj county, which was named after the important Slovak canon in Oradea, RO (Veľký Varadín, SK) Jozef Kozáček (Jozef Kozáček's Theoretical Lyceum). This high school is focused on the study of languages and is studied mainly by students from the surrounding Slovak communities.

At present, there are 2 Slovak high schools in Romania (in Nădlac and in Budoi) - and there are also primary schools for the I. - VIII. year, another 3 primary schools for I. - VIII. years are in Huta Voivozi, RO (Stará Huta, SK); Făgetu, RO (Gemelčička, SK) and Șerani, RO (Šarany, SK), and in addition, there are also 12 other primary schools in Slovakia for Slovaks for years I. - IV. and 14 nurseries as well. On top of that, Slovak as a mother tongue is taught in several other schools as well.

Significant localities with Slovak population in Romania 

The data are from 2002 and 1992.

Slovak diaspora in Serbia 

The majority of the Slovak diaspora in Serbia is concentrated in the autonomous province of Vojvodina, with the capital Novi Sad.

Vojvodina Slovaks 
Slovaks are the third most numerous nationality in the province of Vojvodina. According to the 2011 census, they form an absolute majority in the Bački Petrovac SRB, Báčsky Petrovec SK district (65.37%) and they are the most numerous nationality in the Kovačica district (41.85%).

The Vojvodina Slovaks are descendants of mostly Lutheran emigrants from the 18th and 19th centuries, who settled in the Vojvodina fertile territory, sparsely inhabited after its devastation by the Ottoman Turks. The main causes of Slovak emigration were difficult economic and social conditions, considerable overcrowding and a lack of existential opportunities in their native regions.

According to the 2020 census, the largest Slovak communities are in:

 Stara Pazova SRB (Stará Pazova SK)
 Kovačica SRB and SK
 Bački Petrovac SRB (Báčsky Petrovec SK)
 Padina SRB and SK
 Kovačica
Kisač SRB (Kysáč SK)

The data are from 2002 census.

Slovak diaspora in Croatia 

The Slovak diaspora in Croatia is concentrated mainly in the area of the town of Osijek in the Osijek-Baranja County (districts of Našice, Djakovo, Novska, Osijek, Vukovar). A number of Slovaks also live in the Sisak area. Despite its small number, the Slovak minority in Croatia has significant cultural rights. There are some important Slovak institutions such as Matica Slovenská.

The data are from census of 2011.

Slovak diaspora in Hungary 

Slovaks are the third largest ethnic minority in Hungary. According to the official census, their number ranges from 17.693  to 110.000, which is an estimate of the Slovak organizations with seat in Hungary.

History of the Slovak diaspora in Hungary 

Slovaks lived in what is today's modern Hungary, especially northern Hungary, in many villages at least until the late Middle Ages as a remnant of Slavic settlement living there already before the arrival of the Hungarians. Developments in the coming period remain unexplored due to lack of objective interest from the Hungarian authorities for the time being, with the exception of Hungarian biased nationalist circles spreading inaccurate information. Most Slovaks came to the territory of today's Hungary as part of the settlement of the so-called Lower Lands (Serbia, Romania, Croatia) after the defeat of the Ottoman Empire, more precisely from the end of the 17th to the 19th century. In addition to the traditional Slovak-language islands in Hungarian territory, the former Pest County in 1790 was 52% Slovak., in Pest in 1829 there were just as many Slovaks as there were Hungarians and in 1900 there were about 100,000 Slovaks living in Budapest, the capital of Hungary (Budapest was the city with the largest number of Slovaks in Europe, hence the negative perception from the Hungarians today). In the area between Budapest and today's Slovak border, Slovaks still lived in about half of the villages in 1880s and 1890s, in several areas they even made up more than 50% or 100%. In Nyíregyháza (founded in 1749 as a Slovak settlement) in the 1980s, 8,600 Slovaks lived in addition to more than 13,000 Hungarians, and these Slovaks were called Tirpák. Szeged also had a large Slovak population at the beginning of the 19th century.

In 1920, according to the official Hungarian census, Slovaks still lived as a minority in Hungary in 78 municipalities, with the majority in 41 municipalities (50-75% 21 municipalities, 75-100% 20 municipalities). At that time, more than 500 Slovaks lived in the counties of Székesfehérvár HU (Stoličný Belehrad SK), Komárno SK (Komárom, HU), Veszprém HU (Vesprém SK), Esztergom HU (Ostrihom, SK), Hont SK & HU, Novohrad SK (Nógrád HU), Csongrád HU (Čongrad SK), Heves HU (Heveš SK), Jász-Nagykun-Szolnok HU (Jasovsko-Veľkokumánsko-Solnocká župa SK), Pest-Pilis-Solt-Kiskun HU (Peštiansko-pilišsko-šoltsko-malokumánska župa SK), Budapest HU (Budapešť SK), Borsod-Abaúj-Zemplén HU (Abovsko-Turnianska, Boršadská SK). In 1920, 59.464 of the officially led Slovaks were Roman Catholic, 75.229 were Lutherans, 7.723 were Calvinists, 734 were Jews, the rest (approx. 850) were of other religions. The exchange of population between Czechoslovakia and Hungary in the late 1940s reduced their number by about 70.000.

Today, Slovaks still live in Békés HU (Békešská župa SK), Borsod-Abaúj-Zemplén HU (Abovsko-Turnianska, Boršadská župa SK), Komárom-Esztergom HU (Komárno-Ostrihom SK), Novohrad SK (Nógrád HU) and Pest HU (Pešť SK) counties and in the capital Budapest. Their center is Békéscsaba HU (Békešská Čaba SK). Since the 1990s, they have had national Slovak self-government and self-government at the regional level. The weekly newspapers Ľudové noviny also has an online edition. There are two national Slovak grammar schools in the country - in Budapest and in Békešská Čaba (Békesczaba HU), compared to the 19 Hungarian ones functioning in Slovakia. The modern settlement of Slovaks in Hungary is mainly related to the hinterland of Bratislava, the Slovak capital, while the percentage of approximately 50% was reached by ethnic Slovaks in the village of Rajka.

Numbers of Slovaks in Hungary since 1880 
Number of Slovaks in Hungary according to official Hungarian Kingdoms / Hungarian statistics:

 1880:
 in the whole of Kingdom of Hungary including both present day Slovakia and present-day Hungary: 1,855,000 Slovaks + 219,404 Hungarians fluent in Slovak (a total of 2,074,404 people)
 in the whole of Kingdom of Hungary except present day Slovakia territory: 365.293 Slovaks + unknown number of Hungarians fluent in  Slovak.
 1900 **: only in counties of Székesfehérvár HU (Stoličný Belehrad SK), Pest-Pilis-Solt-Kiskun (Peštiansko-pilišsko-šoltsko-malokumánska župa SK), Borsod HU (Bošrod SK), Békés HU (Békeš SK), Esztergom HU (Ostrihom SK), Csanád HU (Čanád) and Budapest HU (Budapešť SK) 161,636 Slovaks.
 1910 **: 
 in the whole of Kingdom of Hungary including both present day Slovakia and present day Hungary: 1,946,000 * Slovaks + 547,802 Hungarians fluent in Slovak (a total of 2,493,802 people)
 in the whole of Kingdom of Hungary except present day Slovakia territory: 261,319* Slovaks + unknown number of Hungarians fluent in Slovak.
 only in counties of Székesfehérvár HU (Stoličný Belehrad SK), Pest-Pilis-Solt-Kiskun (Peštiansko-pilišsko-šoltsko-malokumánska župa SK), Borsod HU (Bošrod SK), Békés HU (Békeš SK), Esztergom HU (Ostrihom SK), Csanád HU (Čanád) and Budapest HU (Budapešť SK) 145,007 Slovaks + 158,747 Hungarians fluent in Slovak (a total of 303,754 people)
 1920: 141,882 Slovaks + 257,294* Hungarians fluent in Slovak (a total of 399,176 people)
 1930: 104,819 Slovaks
 1941: 75,920 Slovaks (mother tongue; within the borders of today's Hungary only)
 1945-1949: Hungary dismissed 71,969 Slovaks, 7,783 of which illegally, 4,230 before population exchange, the rest within population exchange.
1949 ***: 25,988 Slovaks (by mother tongue)
1990: 10,459 Slovaks; 12,745 persons with Slovak mother tongue; 68,852 persons fluent in Slovak.
2001: 17,693 Slovaks; 11,816 persons with Slovak mother tongue; 18,056 persons fluent in Slovak.
Data up to 1920 are from, later data are generally available in several sources.

According to contemporary Czech-Slovak sources, 630,000 lived in present-day Hungary at the time of the disintegration of Hungarian Kingdom, 350 000 – 450 000, 450,000 / 500,000 – 550,000  of Slovaks. The above-mentioned sums of Slovaks and Hungarians speaking Slovaks also speak in favor of a number between 400,000 and 500,000 in 1918 (this number has been growing steadily in recent Hungarian censuses, although the teaching of Slovak has been declining - in the end it was practically non-existent) and thus Hungarians had no reason to learn the language) according to the Hungarian censuses, as well as the fact that in 1946 the Czech-Slovak commission preparing for the exchange of the population directly in Hungary counted 473,556 Slovaks applying for the exchange. As of 1990 and 2001, it is stated that the actual number of Slovaks in Hungary is 70,000  or respectively 110,000.
In summary, according to statistics, the number of Slovaks in Hungary decreased, depending on the source, from 400,000 - 500,000 / over 300,000 / 145,000 at the beginning of the 20th century to today's official 18,000 people, a decrease in the number of nationalities by 95.5% / 94.2% / 87.5% in only 80 years [without deducting population change. at a height of approx. 70,000 people]. Today, the number of Slovaks is paradoxically higher in distant Serbia or Romania, although there were significantly fewer Slovaks in these countries than in Hungary at the time of the disintegration of Hungarian Kingdom.

Notes 
* The "mother tongue" was officially mentioned here, but this mother tongue was de facto defined in the official instructions for the census commissioners as the most frequently used language, the language the person spoke "most willingly". (It was not possible to determine whether this also applies to the 1930 census and later)

** Census data from 1910 (similarly from 1900) are skewed to the detriment of non-Hungarians mainly due to a specially defined issue implemented by Hungarian census commissioners (see *), further distortion proves the discrepancy of numbers with the development of birth rates and mortality of individual nationalities and demographically impossible increases of the Hungarian population in individual municipalities compared to previous censuses (so-called statistical Hungarianization) 

*** If we compare this number with the data from 1941 and the numbers of the population exchange, we will also get a "deficit" of 22,037 Slovaks at the level of official statistics.

Famous Slovaks from the present-day Hungary territory before 1918 

 Ondrej Beňo
 Samuel Tešedík
 Ján Valašťan Dolinský
 Matej Markovič
 Samuel Mojžišovič
 Ľudovít Augustín Haan
 Sándor Petőfi (considered himself Hungarian but was of Slovak descent)

Famous Slovaks from the present-day Hungary territory after 1918 

 Gregor Papuček
 Jozef Markuš
 Juraj Antal Dolnozemský
 Ondrej Francisci
 Pavel Ondrus
 Pál Závada
 Štefan Markuš

Famous sportsmen 

 Ladislav Kubala

Culture of Slovak diaspora in Hungary 

 Ľudové noviny, a weekly in Slovak
 National Slovak self-government Budapest
 Research Institute of Slovaks in Hungary
 Institute of Slovak Culture in Hungary
 House of Slovak Culture in Békéšská Čaba
 Internet portal

Education 

 Slovak Primary School, Kindergarten and College, Sarvaš 
 Slovak Bilingual Primary School and Kindergarten, Slovenský Komlóš
 General school with Slovak as the language of instruction, Nové Mesto pod Šiatrom 
 Slovak grammar school, primary school, kindergarten and college, Békešská Čaba 
 Kindergarten, primary school, grammar school and college with Slovak as the language of instruction, Budapest

Elsewhere

Famous people of Slovak descent

 Enki Bilal, a French comic book creator, comics artist and film director.
 Jon Voight, an American actor, father Ján Vojtka from Košice
 Eugene Cernan, a retired United States Navy officer and a former NASA astronaut & the last astronaut on the moon. His father was Slovak, his mother was Czech. He kept visiting Slovakia until he was 70 years old.
 Renée Geyer, an Australian singer who has long been regarded as one of the finest exponents of jazz, soul and R&B idioms.
 Lukáš Hrádecký, a Slovak-born Finnish football goalkeeper.
 Tim Hudak, a politician in Ontario, Canada, and the Leader of the Progressive Conservative Party of Ontario (PC Party).
 Angelina Jolie, an American actress and film director. Grandfather Ján Vojtka (John Voight) was from Košice.
 Jon Bon Jovi, an American musician, singer, songwriter, record producer and actor. Grandmother Slovak. He's also Sicilian, German, Russian
 Jim Caviezel, an American actor. His grandmother, named Helena, was Slovak
 Mike Cervenak, an American baseball player.
 Ricardo de Jaxa Malachowski, a Peruvian architect of Polish and Slovak origin.
 Stan Mikita, a Slovak-born Canadian retired professional ice hockey player. Originally named Stanislav Guoth, born in Sokolče, Banská Bystrica
 Paul Newman, an American actor, film director, entrepreneur, humanitarian, and professional racing driver.
 Andrew Poje, a Canadian ice dancer.
 Ivan Reitman, Slovak-Jewish-Canadian film director and film producer, his parents Klára and Ladislav from Komárno.
 Jason Reitman, film director
 Joe Sestak, a former U.S. Navy three-star Admiral and former American politician.
 Jesse Ventura, an American politician, actor, author, veteran, and former professional wrestler.
Paul Newman, actor, mother Terézia Fecková born in Pitičie, Humenné.
Tony Curtis, actor, mother came from Vaľkovo, Poltár.
Pola Negri, first female-European Holywood star, birthname Barbara Apolónia Chalupcová, born in Poland to a Polish mother and Slovak father from Kysuce
Steve Ihnat, actor, birthname Štefan Ihnát, parents from Michalovce district
Jessica Biel, Slovak-Jewish-American actress, Moritz Biel emigrated from Porúbka, Žilina
Dave Grohl, rock musician, his ancestry is Slovak, Irish and German
Steve Ditko, Marvel author and artist, both parents Slovak-Americans.
Justin Jedlica, known as human Ken doll. Both parents are from Bratislava
Michael Fincke, American astronaut, holder of a record for most time spent in Space.
Chuck Bednarik, professional American football player, studied at Slovak school in Pennsylvania, parents were from Široké
Lizabeth Scott, birthname Ema Macová, both parents Slovaks who emigrated to the USA.
Peter Lorre, actor, birthname Ladislav Lowenstein, a Slovak-Jewish-American born in Ružomberok, present-day Slovakia, back in 1904 part of Austria-Hungary
David Dobrik, youtuber, born in Slovakia, as of 2021 still holder of the Slovak citizenship, born in Košice
David Boreanaz, actor, his grandmother was Slovak
Andy Warhol, modern artist, Slovak-Ruthenian ethnic, parents from Miková, Stropkov.
Frank Lowy, businessman and philanthropist, Slovak-Jewish-Hungarian ethnic, born in Fiľakovo, Slovakia, back then part of Czechoslovakia,
John Dopyera, birthname Ján Dopjera, inventor and entrepreneur funder of a musical instrument dobro. Born in Šaštín-Stráže
Joseph Murgas, birthname Jozef Murgaš, a scientist and inventor born in Tajov, Banská Bystrica
Maximilian Hell, a Slovak-German Jesuit priest and astronomer, born in Banská Štiavnica, Slovakia, back then part of the Hungarian Kingdom
Joseph Goldberger, An American physician and epidemiologist of a Slovak-Jewish ancestry born in Giraltovce
Josef Chaim Sonnenfeld, rabbi and co-founder of the Edah HaChareidis, a Haredi Jewish community in Jerusalem, born in Vrbové.
Milan Misik, originally named Milan Mišík, a respected geologist and university professor, born in Skalica
John D. Hertz, a Slovak-Jewish ethnic, businessman, racehorse owner and philanthropist founder of the Yellow Cab company, born in Martin
Stefan Banic, originally named Štefan Banič, parachute inventor, born in Smolenice
 Michael Strank, US marine corps sergeant, killed in the battle of Iwo Jima, one of the flag raisers, helped to raise the 2nd flag on mt Suribachi, born in Jarabina
Peter Sagan, a Slovak professional bicycle racer, earned 3 world championships, born in Žilina
Katarina Van Derham, an American model and actress, born in Ľubochňa
Vladimir Furdik, actor and stunt performer, born in Bratislava
Audrey Hepburn, British actress of Slovak-Dutch ancestry. her grandparents were from Topoľčany district where they owned a sugar refinery
Tom Selleck, American actor, his father was from eastern Slovakia
Robert Urich, American actor and producer, maternal grandparents from Bardejov, eastern Slovakia and his father from western Slovakia
Ivan A. Getting, physicist and engineer, born to Slovak and German immigrants in the US, his Slovak side is from Bytča
Daniel Carleton Gajdusek, medical researcher and Nobel prize holder, an ethnic Slovak-Hungarian, father from Smrdáky
Diana Krall, a Canadian jazz singer, her grandfather was named Kráľ (ENG: King) and he was from Žilina Region
Joe Baksi, a professional heavy weight US box player, a child of Slovak immigrants from Krásna nad Hornádom, today known as Krásna - a city district of Košice
Carolyn Forché, professor, editor, human rights activist, her ancestors came from the county of Tatry
Michael Bednarik, a software engineer, US political figure, both of his parents were Slovaks.
Travis Kalanick, the founder of Uber, his grandparents came from Valaškovce, Humenné
Daddario siblings - Matthew, Alexandra, Catherine, their ancestors came from Krížová Nová Ves, today known as Krížová Ves, Kežmarok
Austin Mahone, singer, songwriter who worked himself up from YouTube, his grandfather was a Slovak-Ruthenian (Eastern Slovakia area)
Bianca Maria Kajlich, her father Ján Kajlich was born in Bratislava

See also 
 History of Slovakia
 List of Slovaks
 :Category:People of Slovak descent

References

External links
 Slovak diaspora

 
European diasporas